Kamchalytamak (Qamsılıtamaq) is a rural locality (a selo) in Kadyrgulovsky Selsoviet, Davlekanovsky District, Bashkortostan, Russia. The population was 475 as of 2010. There are 3 streets.

Geography 
Kamchalytamak is located 48 km east of Davlekanovo (the district's administrative centre) by road. Novoyanbekovo is the nearest rural locality.

References 

Rural localities in Davlekanovsky District